Bulamaj (also Romanized as Būlāmāj; also known as Būlāmāch and Valāmāj) is a village in Qarah Su Rural District, in the Central District of Khoy County, West Azerbaijan Province, Iran. At the 2006 census, its population was 399, in 97 families.

References 

Populated places in Khoy County